Centrin-3 is a protein that in humans is encoded by the CETN3 gene. It belongs to the centrin family of proteins.

The protein encoded by this gene contains four EF-hand calcium binding domains, and is a member of the centrin protein family. Centrins are evolutionarily conserved proteins similar to the CDC31 protein of S. cerevisiae. Yeast CDC31 is located at the centrosome of interphase and mitotic cells, where it plays a fundamental role in centrosome duplication and separation. Multiple forms of the proteins similar to the yeast centrin have been identified in human and other mammalian cells, some of which have been shown to be associated with centrosome fractions. This protein appears to be one of the most abundant centrins associated with centrosome, which suggests a similar function to its yeast counterpart.

References

External links

Further reading

EF-hand-containing proteins